Postage Paid is a form of indication on an envelope that the costs for sending were paid in another way than using stamps or a franking machine. The indication is usually placed in the upper right corner of the front side of an envelope, where otherwise stamps would have been stuck.

Post sent using Postage Paid often cannot be sent through a public letter box, but need to be handed over at a post office or business point, where the postage needs to be paid immediately or can be paid later via bank transfer. This method of paying franking costs are commonly used by large companies or organisations sending hundreds of letters each day.

Postal markings